Jornada Linux Mobility Edition or JLime is a Linux distribution originally aimed for the HP Jornada platform. It was created in late 2003 by Kristoffer Ericson and Henk Brunstin. It is developed using the OpenEmbedded build system.

History and name 
The work on JLime began in late 2003 due to the need for a working Linux distribution on the HP 6xx Jornada platform. The idea behind JLime is a distribution that brings speed and portability to the Jornada.
The Jornada had been unsupported in 2.6 kernel (due to lack of developers / test machines) and first year was focused on enabling support. 2.6.9 was the first kernel to be able to boot.

In early February 2006 the JLime site was renovated by the JLime forum user "chazco".

Later development added the NEC Mobilepro 900 and Ben NanoNote among the supported devices.

JLime installer 
JLime developers "Chazco" and "B_Lizzard" created an initrd based installation tool which can install JLime onto the Jornada 6xx without the need of any Linux machine, however development of this method has halted and has not been applied to any handheld PC other than the jornada 6xx. Most PDA systems use flash memory, but the Jornada handheld computers lack this facility. Therefore, JLime is installed onto a (partitioned) compact flash card. The installer uses a text based dialog orientated interface.

Package management 
JLime uses a minimalistic tool of APT called ipkg to handle packages (see package management system), it can install/remove/update through any existing internet connection or locally. Packages are downloaded from so-called feed repositories and dependencies are handled automatically.

IceWM on Jornada
JLime is a fully functioning Linux distro and currently uses IceWM window manager as a GUI 'environment'.  JLime includes the following applications with IceWM: Minimo, XChat, dillo, Rox-filer, Abiword, Leafpad, Torsmo and a few other useful applications.

Developer List 
Here is the list of the current active developers involved in the JLiME project.

Kernel maintainers
Kristoffer Ericson (kristoffer) - kernel hp6xx/hp7xx
Rafael Ignacio Zurita (rafa) - kernel hp6xx
Michael Petchkovsky (cosmo0) - kernel mp900

Package maintainers
Alex Palestras (B_lizzard) - packages hp6xx (OE)
Matt Oudenhoven (wicked) - packages hp7xx/mp900 (OE)

Site maintainers
chazco - General maintenance - webmaster

Past maintainers
Jan Misiak (fijam) - Documentation maintainer & Kernel Tester (2006 - Oct 2007)

Releases

JLime developed ports

See also 
 Familiar Linux
 Jornada (PDA)
 HP Jornada X25
 MobilePro
 OpenEmbedded

References

External links 
 jLime Home page
 Review of JLime Donkey 1.0.2 by Charles Hague, HPC:Factor (22 January 2007)

Pocket PC software
Platform-specific Linux distributions
Embedded Linux distributions
Linux distributions